Battista Cardinale (10 June 1895 – 21 August 1978) was an Italian wrestler. He competed in the Greco-Roman light heavyweight event at the 1920 Summer Olympics.

References

External links
 

1895 births
1978 deaths
Olympic wrestlers of Italy
Wrestlers at the 1920 Summer Olympics
Italian male sport wrestlers
Sportspeople from Genoa